Pratu Pa is a village and tambon (sub-district) of Mueang Lamphun District, in Lamphun Province, Thailand. In 2005 it had a  population of  5832 people. The tambon contains nine villages.

References

Tambon of Lamphun province
Populated places in Lamphun province